Lake Ōkataina (also spelled Okataina;  or )  is the northernmost and largest of four smaller lakes lying between Lake Rotorua and Lake Tarawera in the Bay of Plenty Region of New Zealand's North Island. The others are Lake Rotokakahi (Green Lake), Lake Tikitapu (Blue Lake), and Lake Ōkareka. All lie within the Ōkataina caldera, along its western edge.

Unlike many other lakes in the region, Lake Ōkataina is completely encircled by native forest. It also has no inlets or outlets.  Perhaps as a result, over the past 30 years, the level of the lake has risen and fallen in a range of about 5 metres.

The New Zealand Ministry for Culture and Heritage gives a translation of "place of laughter" for Ōkataina.

The lake can be accessed by road via Hinehopu on the southern shores of Lake Rotoiti. At the end of the road there is a large sandy beach, a massive grassed area and the privately owned Okataina Lodge. Due to changes in the surface level of the lake, the lodge jetty has at times been either completely submerged or left high and dry.

The area around the lodge is heavily populated by tammar wallabies introduced from Australia in the 19th century.

References

External links
 

Lake Okataina
Okataina Volcanic Centre
Lakes of the Bay of Plenty Region
VEI-6 volcanoes
Volcanic crater lakes
Taupō Volcanic Zone